Bath is an unincorporated community on the Saint John River in Carleton County, New Brunswick, Canada. It held village status prior to 2023.

Bath is famous for the annual "Bath Fall Fair" which took place every Labour Day with a parade and fair and to end the night fireworks.

History

Soldiers from the War of 1812 first settled in the area. Historically, Bath has been largely dependent on the St. John River as means of communication with other areas in the province, hydropower and transportation. Transportation in Bath changed drastically by the addition of railway in the 1870s, residents of the village were now able to travel via rail instead of the river. The railway brought growth to Bath with the new retail stores, axe factory, four hotels and blacksmith shop opening as a result of the railway.  The post office dates from 1875.

On 1 January 2023, Bath became part of the new town of Carleton North. The community's name remains in official use.

Demographics 
Revised census figures based on the 2023 local governance reforms have not been released.

Economy 
The economy in Bath has taken a downturn in recent years. Small businesses are scattered around the village and are the backbone of Bath.

There is only one restaurant in Bath: Diner Down Under. The eatery offers a family dining experience. The other restaurant, "The Monquarter" is now permanently closed since early 2018.

Two hairdresser options for the residents of Bath including Shape and Shear and Frank's Barber Shop.

Religion

Bath is within the region of New Brunswick referred to as the "Bible Belt," and it has a high number of churches in relation to the small population of the area. There are three churches with the town limits:

Church of St. Joseph is the Roman Catholic Church belonging to the Diocese of St. John 

United Pentecostal Church of Bath 

United Baptist Parsonage

Education

The Bath Community School currently enrolls 188 students from Kindergarten to grade 8. The school is in the Anglophone West School District. The Bath Elementary School was recently closed and students moved to the Bath Middle School directly beside. This "new" school was named Bath Community School and the current principal is Mitchell Hemphill. The Bath Community School is receiving $250,000 investment from the provincial government to aid in planning of upcoming renovations. The funds will be directed to the  2017-2018 capital budget.

Politics

The Member of Parliament for the Tobique-Mactuquac riding in the House of Commons of Canada is TJ Harvey. As a Canadian Liberal TJ became federal representation for residents of Bath, New Brunswick in the 2015 elections.

Member of Legislative Assembly for the Carleton-Victoria riding is Andrew Harvey. Elected in 2014, Andrew Harvey serves the residents of Bath on a provincial level. Andrew Harvey is the New Brunswick Minister of Agriculture, Mines and Rural Affairs.

Charitable organizations

Bath is fortunate enough to have active charitable organizations in the village that work hard towards the betterment of the community.

The Knights of Columbus is an international group of Catholic men taking charitable action. Charity is their main focus and the organization works hard to improve quality of life in Bath and surrounding areas. The Grand Knight of the Bath branch is Hermel Langlais.

The Lions Club is the largest service club organization. The club has multiple projects in the village all directed towards charitable actions. The President of the Bath Lions Club is Gerald Sullivan.

The River View Manor is a non-profit and registered charitable organization located in Bath, New Brunswick. The River View Manor opened in 1981 and is a beneficial contributor to the village of Bath economy. There are 39 residents in the manor and over 50 employees.

Events
River Run is a recently established tradition for the Village of Bath. Kayaks and canoes paddle down the St. John River each year on New Brunswick day from Bath to the next town, Florenceville-Bristol.

Bath Fall Fair has been a tradition in the Village of Bath since Labor Day in 1944. The fair takes place each year at the Bath Fair Grounds during Labour Day weekend. It begins with a parade throughout the town and continues with other events including:

Western New Brunswick International Balloon Festival begins in Bath on the Thursday before Labor Day and ends on the Monday. The festival occurs on the Bath Fair Grounds and is a family friendly event that gives locals an opportunity to experience hot air balloon rides and the beauty of witnessing a balloon festival.

Trevor-Goodine Professional Lumberjack Competition is held on Labour Day at the Bath Fair Grounds. It is a Maritime Lumberjack Association sanctioned event.

Notable people

Bath is the birthplace of Buzz Hargrove, former president of the Canadian Auto Workers, Rev. Brent Hawkes, Charlotte MacLeod, mystery fiction writer, and Kate Ryan, famous in the Yukon Gold Rush.

See also
List of communities in New Brunswick

References

External links
 Village of Bath

Communities in Carleton County, New Brunswick
Former villages in New Brunswick